Carabus pustulifer is a species of ground beetle from family Carabidae first described by Hippolyte Lucas in 1869. They are black coloured.

References

pustulifer
Beetles described in 1869